Arrouquelas is a civil parish in the municipality of Rio Maior, Portugal. The population in 2011 was 591, in an area of 27.81 km².

References

Freguesias of Rio Maior